Koulis (Ioannis) Stoligkas or Stoligas (1909 or 1910, Drama, Salonica Vilayet, Ottoman Empire – 25 February 1984, Athens), was a Greek actor, one of the most loved stars in the Greek cinema and played in several movies including Exo oi kleftes (Go away you thieves).  He lived his final years away from the limelight and journaled along with his two brothers and had no children. He was buried at the cemetery of Kokkinos Mylos in Nea Filadelfeia, Athens.

External links

20th-century births
1984 deaths
People from Drama, Greece
People from Salonica vilayet
Greeks from the Ottoman Empire
Greek male actors
20th-century Greek male actors